Helen Christine Alfredsson (born 9 April 1965) is a Swedish  professional golfer who played primarily on the U.S.-based LPGA Tour and is also a life member of the Ladies European Tour. She won the LPGA major Nabisco Dinah Shore and twice finished second in the U.S. Women's Open. She also won the Women's British Open once and the Evian Masters three times before those events were designated as majors in women's golf by the LPGA Tour. In 2019, she won a "senior slam" by winning both of the senior women's major championships.

Amateur career
Alfredsson was born in Gothenburg, Sweden and at age 11 began playing golf at Gullbringa Golf & Country Club north of Gothenburg. At young ages, she represented Sweden on both junior level and in the national amateur team.

She attended United States International University, San Diego, California, playing in their golf team led by coach Gordon Severson and graduated in 1988. During summer time she played in Sweden and won the Swedish Match-play Championship three years in a row 1986 through 1988, as an amateur while the championship since 1986 had become open for professionals and part of the Swedish Golf Tour for women.

In 1987, she was a member of the winning Swedish team at the European Ladies' Team Championship at Turnberry, Scotland. She was also a member of the Swedish team in the Espirito Santo Trophy 1986 and 1988. At home soil in Stockholm in 1988, Sweden finished second after the United States, which was at the time, the best Swedish finish ever. The same year Alfredsson finished individual bronze-medallist at the European Ladies' Championship at Pedrena Golf Club, Spain.

She turned professional on 1 January 1989.

Professional career
Alfredsson began her professional career on the Ladies European Tour where she was awarded 1989 Rookie of the Year. The next year, in 1990, she claimed her maiden professional win at the Women's British Open. She won twice on the LET in 1991 and won once each on the Australian and Japan tours. She earned exempt status for the 1992 LPGA Tour season by tying for 17th at the LPGA Final Qualifying Tournament.

She earned Rookie of the Year honors on the LPGA Tour in 1992 and has won seven LPGA Tour events, including one LPGA major: the 1993 Nabisco Dinah Shore. A little over three months after her Dinah Shore victory, Alfredsson nearly won the U.S. Women's Open at Crooked Stick Golf Club. Alfredsson entered the final round with a two-stroke advantage, but finished tied for 2nd, one shot behind winner Lauri Merten.

At the 1994 U.S. Women's Open at Indianwood Golf & Country Club, Michigan, Alfredsson shot an 8 under first round 63, a new tournament single round record. Her 36-hole total 132 also broke the tournament record. When she reached 13 under during the third round, it was at the time the lowest score to par ever reached in a U.S. Open, by men or women. After playing her last 29 holes in 14 over par, she fell to tied 9th, eight shots behind winner Patty Sheehan.

During her career on the LPGA Tour, Alfredsson continued to play a limited number of events in Europe, where she won eleven times. She finished on top of the Ladies European Tour money list in 1998.

In 2008, Alfredsson came back, after recovering from injuries in her leg, back and shoulder, and won her third Evian Masters title, her first LPGA Tour win in five years.

She was member of the European Solheim Cup team as a player eight times: 1990, 1992, 1994, 1996, 1998, 2000, 2002 and 2009. She was appointed captain of the 2007 European Solheim Cup team, losing to the United States team 12-16. When she qualified for the European Team at the 2009 Solheim Cup, she became the first, and still the only, player on both teams, to qualify as a player after she has been the team captain a previous year.

While playing golf, Alfredsson has been known to curse long and loud in Swedish. The Financial Times of London once editorialized "They can be louder and more richly worded than many of Lenny Bruce's best performances". Alfredsson said about cursing "You have to stay so focused on the tour, you work so hard, you don't want anything to interfere. But then all of a sudden this little devil comes crawling out, saying, 'It's time to do something. You've been good too long." "

In September 2013, Alfredsson officially announced her retirement from the LPGA Tour.

She is a life time member of the Ladies European Tour.

After her retirement from competitive golf on the regular tour, she came back, playing on the women's senior tour, the Legends Tour, primarily in the senior majors, with great success. She tied for third in the inaugural Senior LPGA Championship in 2017 and improved that by finishing tied second at the 2018 Senior LPGA Championship. She won both of the two senior ladies major championships in 2019, the U.S. Senior Women's Open and the Senior LPGA Championship, completing the same "senior slam" as Laura Davies achieved in 2018.

Personal life
At young age she practiced ice skating and team handball. Her father Björn was a six-time Swedish handball champion and a keen golfer himself. The father and daughter won the 1999 Swedish Two Generations Mixed Championship, played as 36-hole foursome.

In later years Alfredsson has practiced yoga.

During her college years in San Diego, California, she met Leonardo Cuéllar, the school's soccer coach and a former World Cup and Olympic soccer player for Mexico. The couple later got engaged.

After graduating in 1988 with a degree in International Business and Marketing, she tried a career in Paris, France as a model and stayed for six months.

In 2005, Alfredsson married former National Hockey League player Kent Nilsson and became stepmother of his son, hockey player Robert Nilsson. Kent Nilsson was en elite amateur golfer himself, with a handicap below scratch. They divorced in 2016, but came back to live together.

She has contributed to the foundation of a charity golf tournament supporting research on Alzheimer's disease, which affected her mother, who died in 2010.

Amateur wins 
1981 Swedish Junior Match-play Championship
1982 Belgian Open Junior Championship
1983 Swedish Junior Match-play Championship
1985 Swedish Junior Match-play Championship
Source:

Professional wins (29)

LPGA Tour wins (7)

LPGA Tour playoff record (1–3)

Ladies European Tour wins (11)

Ladies European Tour playoff record (4–1)

Note: Alfredsson won The Evian Championship (formerly named the Evian Masters) three times before it was recognized as a major championship on the LPGA Tour in 2013. One of those wins was after the Evian Masters was co-sanctioned with the LPGA Tour in 2000. Alfredsson won the Women's British Open once before it was co-sanctioned by the LPGA Tour in 1994, and recognized as a major championship on the LPGA Tour in 2001.

Note:
1 Co-sanctioned by LPGA Tour and Ladies European Tour

Sources:

LPGA of Japan Tour wins (3)
1991 Daio Paper Elleair Ladies Open
1992 Itoki Classic
1997 Itoen Ladies

ALPG Tour wins (1)
1991 Queensland Open

Swedish Golf Tour wins (4)

Other wins (2)
1991 Benson & Hedges Trophy (with Anders Forsbrand)
1992 Sunrise Cup World Team Championship (with Liselotte Neumann)

Legends Tour wins (2)

Major championships

Wins (1)

Results timeline

^ The Women's British Open replaced the du Maurier Classic as an LPGA major in 2001.
^^ The Evian Championship was added as a major in 2013.

CUT = missed the half-way cut
DQ = disqualified
WD = withdrew
T = tied

Summary

Most consecutive cuts made – 9 (1997 Kraft Nabisco Championship – 1999 Kraft Nabisco Championship)
Longest streak of top-10s – 2 (1993 U.S. Open – 1993 du Maurier Classic)

Team appearances
Amateur
European Lady Junior's Team Championship (representing Sweden): 1980, 1981 (winners), 1982, 1983, 1984 (winners), 1986
European Ladies' Team Championship (representing Sweden): 1983, 1985, 1987 (winners)
Espirito Santo Trophy (representing Sweden): 1986, 1988

Professional
Solheim Cup (representing Europe): 1990, 1992 (winners), 1994, 1996, 1998, 2000 (winners), 2002, 2007 (non-playing captain), 2009
World Cup (representing Sweden): 2007
Lexus Cup (representing International team): 2008 (winners)
Handa Cup (representing World team): 2012 (tie), 2013 (winners), 2014, 2015

See also
List of golfers with most Ladies European Tour wins

References

External links

Swedish female golfers
LPGA Tour golfers
Ladies European Tour golfers
Winners of LPGA major golf championships
Solheim Cup competitors for Europe
United States International University alumni
Sportspeople from Gothenburg
1965 births
Living people